Whiplash is a 2014 American drama film directed by Damien Chazelle. The screenplay, also written by Chazelle, was partly based on his experiences in the Princeton High School Studio Band. The film stars Miles Teller as an ambitious jazz drummer selected to join a school studio band taught by a cruel music instructor played by J. K. Simmons. Paul Reiser, Melissa Benoist, and Austin Stowell feature in supporting roles.

The film premiered at the opening night of the 2014 Sundance Film Festival on January 16, 2014, where it went on to win the Grand Jury Prize and Audience Award for Dramatic Feature. Sony Picture Classics provided a limited release in United States and Canada on October 10, 2014. The film grossed more than $48million at the worldwide box office on a production budget of $3.3million. Rotten Tomatoes, a review aggregator, surveyed 290 reviews and judged 93% to be positive.

Whiplash garnered awards and nominations in a variety of categories with particular praise for Chazelle's screenplay and direction, Teller and Simmons' performance, and Tom Cross' editing. At the 87th Academy Awards, the film received five nominations with Simmons winning for Best Supporting Actor, Cross for Best Film Editing, and the Academy Award for Best Sound Mixing. Whiplash garnered five nominations at the British Academy Film Awards with Simmons winning for Best Supporting Actor, Cross for Best Editing, and the BAFTA Award for Best Sound. Simmons also received awards in the "Best Supporting Actor" category at the 72nd Golden Globe Awards, 21st Screen Actors Guild Awards, and the 20th Critics' Choice Awards. The American Film Institute included the film in their list of top ten films of the year.

Accolades

See also
 2014 in film

References

External links
 

Lists of accolades by film